Di Bagley Stovall (born 1947) is an American artist. Her work is included in the collections of the Smithsonian American Art Museum and the Columbus Museum, Columbus, Georgia. She married print-maker Lou Stovall in 1971. They have one child, Will Stovall, an artist in his own right, who now manages the Lou Stovall Workshop, a print-making studio in the Cleveland Park neighborhood of Washington DC where Lou and Di live and work.

References

Living people
1947 births
20th-century American women artists
21st-century American women artists